The David Grisman Rounder Record is an album by American musician David Grisman, released in 1976.

Track listing 
All songs by David Grisman unless otherwise noted.
 "Hello" – :22
 "Sawing On The Strings" (Lewis Compton) – 3:17
 "Waiting On Vassar" – 5:00
 "I Ain't Broke But I'm Badly Bent" (Public Domain) – 1:55
 "Opus 38" – 3:15
 "Hold To God's Unchanging Hand" (Public Domain) – 3:35
 "Boston Boy" (Traditional) – 2:27
 "Cheyenne" (Bill Monroe) – 4:45
 "'Til The End Of The World Rolls 'Round" (Newton Thomas) – 2:55
 "You'll Find Her Name Written There" (Harold Hensley) – 2:55
 "On And On" (Bill Monroe) – 3:43
 "Bob's Brewin'" – 4:57
 "So Long" – :18

Personnel
David Grisman – mandolin, mandola, mandocello, vocals
Tony Rice – guitar, vocals
Vassar Clements – violin
Jerry Douglas – dobro
Bill Keith – banjo
Ricky Skaggs – violin, vocals
Tony Trischka – banjo
Buck White – mandolin
Todd Phillips – bass
Production notes:
David Grisman – producer, engineer, mixing
Dana Thomas – engineer
Bob Ludwig - mastering
Todd Phillips – cover photo

References

1976 albums
David Grisman albums